The following is a list of Delta IV Heavy launches since 2004.

The Delta IV Heavy (Delta 9250H) is an expendable heavy-lift launch vehicle, the largest type of the Delta IV family and the world's second highest-capacity rocket in operation, behind SpaceX's Falcon Heavy rocket and closely followed by CNSA's Long March 5 rocket. It is manufactured by United Launch Alliance and was first launched in 2004.

About the Delta IV Heavy 

The Delta IV Heavy consists of a central Common Booster Core (CBC), with two additional CBCs as liquid rocket boosters instead of the GEM-60 solid rocket motors used by the Delta IV Medium+ versions. At lift off, all three cores operate at full thrust, and 44 seconds later the center core throttles down to 55% to conserve fuel until booster separation. The boosters burn out at 242 seconds after launch and are separated as the core booster throttles back up to full thrust. The core burns out 86 seconds later, and the second stage completes the ascent to orbit.

The rocket uses three RS-68 engines, one in the central core and one in each booster.

On 24 September 2022, the last Delta 4 flight from Vandenberg launched the NROL-91 mission from SLC-6.

Launch statistics

Launch history

Future launches 
Missions thirteen through sixteen were announced by the National Reconnaissance Office. For the final four missions (13-16) including modifications, ULA was awarded US$2.2 billion, or US$440 million per launch. This can be compared with the Falcon Heavy launch price of $90M to $150M. , two missions remain before ULA retires the Delta IV Heavy.

Notes

References 

Lists of Delta launches
Lists of rocket launches